Anna Montgomery Campbell (1991 – 15 March 2018), also known as Hêlîn Qereçox, was a British feminist, anarchist and prison abolition activist who fought with the Women's Protection Units (YPJ) in the Rojava conflict of the Syrian civil war. She was killed in Rojava by a Turkish Armed Forces missile strike.

Ancestry and early life 
Campbell was born in Lewes, East Sussex, England, the daughter of progressive rock musician Dirk Campbell. Her mother was Katherine Emma "Adrienne Katie", born Bridges, her father's second wife.

Campbell had military forebears, with ancestors serving in the Royal Navy and Royal Artillery. Her grandfather served in The Royal Tank Regiment in World War II.

She was educated at St Mary's Hall, Brighton, then went to study at University of Sheffield before moving to Bristol, where she worked as a plumber. Campbell was involved with many political actions, including the 2010 United Kingdom student protests, the Hunt Saboteurs Association, Anarchist Black Cross and other anarchist and abolitionist organisations and projects, including international ones such as ZAD de Notre-Dame-des-Landes.

Involvement in the Rojava conflict 
During the Rojava conflict, Campbell fought with the YPJ in the Deir ez-Zor campaign, an attack on the Islamic State of Iraq and the Levant stronghold of Deir ez-Zor. She was also involved in the YPJ's activities in support of women's rights in Kurdistan. According to The New York Times, she was moved by the defence of "an autonomous, mostly Kurdish region in northern Syria, known as Rojava, whose leaders advocate a secular, democratic and egalitarian politics, with equal rights for women".

Death 
Campbell was killed by a Turkish Armed Forces missile strike during the Turkish military operation in the Afrin Canton, Operation Olive Branch. The YPJ announced:

She is the first British woman to die fighting for the YPJ.

Following the announcement of Campbell's death, her father started a campaign to recover her body, which could not be located by aid organisations until a ceasefire was in place in the area. Dirk Campbell accused the British government of 'a total lack of proactivity' in helping to recover her body, which is yet to be recovered from the battlefield as of 2021.

In response to Campbell's death there were various protests around the world, protesters from the Bristol Kurdish Solidarity Network (BKSN) and friends of Campbell blocked the offices of BAE Systems in Bristol, the city Anna lived in previously. Activists accuse the company of supplying weapons to Turkey which have been used against civilians in Rojava. Another protest in Bristol was held a year after Anna's death. It was reported to have blocked a large roundabout and caused traffic problems in the local area. Graffiti has also sprung up in the city showing solidarity, particularly in the Easton, Bristol and Saint Pauls where many of the anarchist projects she was part of are based.

As well as the local protests support has been shown from many other individuals and projects across the world.

References

Further reading 

 
 
 
 Immortal : mourning, martyrs & murals, 2019,

External links 

1991 births
2018 deaths
Anarcha-feminists
Women soldiers
Military personnel killed in the Syrian civil war
People from Lewes
British feminists
British anarchists
British plumbers
Alumni of the University of Sheffield
People's Protection Units
Foreigners killed in the Syrian civil war
Deaths by airstrike during the Syrian civil war
British war casualties